Hassan Ali Al-Raheb (born 7 April 1983) is a former Saudi football player who played as a second striker.

Club career
In Summer 2008, Al-Raheb moved to Al-Ahli. In 2012, Al-Raheb moved to Najran club. He later joined Al-Nassr in the Winter of 2013. In 2018, he joined Al-Shabab. On 12 October 2020, Al-Raheb announced his retirement.

International career
Al-Raheb played for Saudi Arabia from 2008 until 2009. Later on, he was called up for a friendly match against Iraq in 2018.

Honours
Al-Khaleej
Saudi First Division: 2005–06

Al-Ahli
Gulf Club Champions Cup: 2008
Saudi Champions Cup: 2011, 2012

Al Nassr
Saudi Crown Prince Cup: 2013–14
Saudi Professional League: 2013–14, 2014–15

References

External links

1983 births
Living people
Saudi Arabian Shia Muslims
Saudi Arabian footballers
Saudi Arabia international footballers
Al-Taraji Club players
Al-Ahli Saudi FC players
Najran SC players
Khaleej FC players
Al Nassr FC players
Al-Shabab FC (Riyadh) players
Saudi First Division League players
Saudi Professional League players
People from Qatif
Association football forwards